Burda Style (formerly Burda Moden) is a fashion magazine published in 17 languages and in over 100 countries. Each issue contains patterns for every design featured that month. The magazine is published by Hubert Burda Media.

History and profile
In 1949, Aenne Burda expanded her family business into women's magazines publishing, founding a fashion magazine printing and publishing company in her home town of Offenburg, Germany. The same year she debuted the magazine Favorit, which was later renamed to Burda Moden. The first issue of Burda Moden magazine was published in 1950 with a circulation of 100,000. It gained popularity after 1952, when it began to include patterns for clothes.

In 1987, Burda Fashion became the first Western magazine to be published in the Soviet Union. In 1994 it became the first Western magazine to appear in the People’s Republic of China.

Burda Style launched in the United States in 2013, in partnership with F+W Media.

See also
 List of magazines in Germany
 Hubert Burda Media
 Hubert Burda

References

External links 
BurdaStyle.com
Hubert-Burda-Media.de
Aenne-Burda.com

1950 establishments in West Germany
German-language magazines
Magazines established in 1950
Monthly magazines published in Germany
Women's fashion magazines
Women's magazines published in Germany
Arts and crafts magazines